William Matthews (born July 22, 1947) is a Canadian politician.

Political career
Matthews was a Progressive Conservative member of the Newfoundland and Labrador House of Assembly from 1982 to 1996. During this time, he was a cabinet minister, as Minister of Culture, Recreation and Youth from 1985 to 1988 and Minister of Career Development and Advanced Studies from 1988 to 1989.

Matthews was later elected to the House of Commons of Canada in 1997 as a member of the Progressive Conservative Party of Canada, representing the riding of Burin—St. George's. He crossed the floor to the Liberals in 1999, and continued to represent the riding until 2004. In that year's federal election, he was elected to the newly redistributed district of Random—Burin—St. George's, which he represented until 2008.

Matthews is a former teacher. He is a former Parliamentary Secretary to the Queen's Privy Council for Canada and Minister of Intergovernmental Affairs, Deputy House Leader of the Progressive Conservative Party, and Progressive Conservative critic of Fisheries and Oceans.

In March 2007, Matthews called Prime Minister Stephen Harper a "liar." While Speaker of the House Peter Milliken didn't give in to demands from outraged Tories to throw Matthews out of the chamber, Milliken did not allow Matthews to rise in the House for what would be the last 14 months of Matthews' career.  Matthews did not run for reelection in the 2008 election.

In October 2018, Matthews was appointed as Chief of Staff to provincial PC leader Ches Crosbie in the Opposition Office.

Matthews contested the 2019 provincial election as the PC candidate in Burin-Grand Bank, but was defeated by Liberal incumbent Carol Anne Haley.

Electoral record

 
|NDP
|Joseph L. Edwards
|align="right"|181
|align="right"|
|align="right"|
|-
|}

|-
|}

 
|NDP
|Calvin Peach
|align="right"|431
|align="right"|7.0
|align="right"|
|-
|}

 
|NDP
|Eric Miller
|align="right"|234
|align="right"|4.23
|align="right"|
|-
|}

References

External links
 

1947 births
Liberal Party of Canada MPs
Living people
Members of the House of Commons of Canada from Newfoundland and Labrador
Progressive Conservative Party of Newfoundland and Labrador MHAs
Progressive Conservative Party of Canada MPs
People from Grand Bank
21st-century Canadian politicians